Tomáš Štůrala (born January 5, 1985) is a Czech professional ice hockey goaltender. He played with HC Zlín in the Czech Extraliga during the 2010–11 Czech Extraliga season.

References

External links

1985 births
Czech ice hockey goaltenders
PSG Berani Zlín players
Living people
Sportspeople from Nový Jičín
LHK Jestřábi Prostějov players
Hokej Šumperk 2003 players